"Acaramelao" (English: "Caramelized") is a song by Argentine singer-songwriter María Becerra. It was written by Becerra and Enzo Sauthier and produced by Big One. The song was released on 25 February 2022 as the second single from her debut studio album, Animal.

The song is featured on the album's first part and extended play (EP) Animal, Pt. 1.

Background

On 22 February 2021 María Becerra revealed the title and released date for her extended play (EP) and first part of her debut album Animal, Pt. 1, in which "Acaramelao" was included. The song was officially released on 25 February 2021 alongside the four track EP.

Commercial performance

In Argentina, the song debuted at number 28 on the Billboard Argentina Hot 100 during the tracking week of 13 March 2021. On its third week, the song entered the top ten. The song reached the top five at number 4 on its seventh week, becoming Becerra's fourth top 5 in the chart. The song would spend 28 weeks on the chart.

Music video

The music video for "Acaramaleo" was directed by Julián Levy and was released on 25 February 2021 simultaneously with the rest of the EP Animal, Pt. 1, including a music video for each track. As of December 2022, the song has accumulated 108M views.

Charts

References

2021 singles
2021 songs
María Becerra songs
Spanish-language songs